Istanbulkart is a contactless smart card for fare payment on public transport in Istanbul, Turkey. It was introduced on March 23, 2009 in addition to the Akbil, an integrated electronic ticket system which was eventually phased out in 2015. The card was developed and put into practice by the information technology company Belbim of the Metropolitan Municipality.

The Istanbulkart is valid for boarding buses, funiculars, LRT, subway, commuter trains, ferryboats and trams operated by the Metropolitan Municipality and private companies. Cash payment on these transport systems is not possible. Reduced fees are applicable for up to five transfers within two hours to other vehicles on the transportation network.

There are four different types of the Istanbulkart, one ordinary and three special. The special cards are issued upon the holder's legal eligibility, and are therefore personalized:
 Ordinary card: for full fare payment,
 Mavi Kart (Blue card) (season ticket): seasonal ticket discounted on monthly use basis,
 Discounted card: for students, teachers, senior citizens (over 60 years of age)
 Free card: for  handicapped or disabled persons, senior citizens (over 65 years of age) and government employees underway on duty.

The ordinary cards may be acquired from offices at major transport interchanges for a nonrefundable deposit of 50TL. It can be purchased for 50TL from vending machines located at metro entrances. The remaining sum will be deposited on the card. Afterwards, the cards can be loaded with credits up to 300 TL at these offices, special purpose machines, vending machines on the metro or at news-stands and small shops which offer this service. Cards for a limited number of passes (1, 2, 3, 5 or 10) are also available.

Unlike the ordinary cards, the special cards are issued on a named basis, so they require an application to be made at one of the 13 application centers, or on the internet.

It is not necessary for the card to touch the reader, cards inside a wallet or a handbag can be also read for rapid payment. The reader device signals confirmation of the fare payment with an audible sound, and the screen turns green showing the payment and the remaining deposit after a split second.

In case of insufficient deposit on the smart card, the card reader shows the warning message "Yetersiz Bakiye" (Insufficient deposit) on its display along with an audible warning. Counterfeit cards will be confiscated by the bus driver or security personnel at the turnpikes.

The Istanbulkart is compatible with international standards such as ISO/IEC 7816 and ISO/IEC 14443 and is built using NXP's DESFire technology. Its use is planned to be extended to payments at municipality operated parking lots and theatres, as well as for privately owned taxis, Dolmuş (share taxis) and movie theatres. The personalized type of the smart card can also be used in a more general form for admission to an event or establishment or for municipality provided social welfare purposes. Due to the outbreak of the COVID-19 pandemic, since 2021, all passengers using an Istanbulkart are required to pair it with their HES (Hayat Eve Sığar, literally "Life Fits into Home") code, a public health tracking system.

See also
 İzmir Kentkart

References

Fare collection systems in Turkey
Transport in Istanbul
Contactless smart cards
2009 establishments in Turkey
Rapid transit in Turkey
Ferry transport in Turkey
Public transport in Istanbul